Zhokhovo is a rural locality (a village) in Kopninskoye Rural Settlement, Sobinsky District, Vladimir Oblast, Russia. The population was 107 as of 2010.

Geography 
Zhokhovo is located on the left bank of the Klyazma River, 26 km southwest of Sobinka (the district's administrative centre) by road. Pogost is the nearest rural locality.

References 

Rural localities in Sobinsky District